"Anthem (We Are the Fire)" is a song by American metal band Trivium. The song was released as the third single from the band's third studio album The Crusade. The single failed to chart in the United States, but was a moderate success in the United Kingdom, reaching number 40 on the UK Singles Chart and number 1 on the UK Rock Chart.

The song was written by lead vocalist/rhythm guitarist Matt Heafy and bassist/backing vocalist Paolo Gregoletto.

Music video
The song's music video was directed by Nathan Cox.

The video begins with shots of people at a party at a mansion. The band members arrive at the mansion and walk through it to the backyard, where they start to perform the song. Fans suddenly show up at the mansion and rush to the band perform, with the party goers looking on in confusion. The video continues with the fans watching the band perform.

Track listing
Enhanced single

Promo single

Personnel
Trivium
Matt Heafy – lead vocals, guitar
Corey Beaulieu – guitar, backing vocals
Paolo Gregoletto – bass, backing vocals
Travis Smith – drums

See also
List of UK Rock & Metal Singles Chart number ones of 2006

References

External links
Official Music Video at YouTube

2006 songs
2006 singles
Trivium (band) songs
Roadrunner Records singles
Songs written by Matt Heafy
Songs written by Paolo Gregoletto